Rob Steen is the illustrator of the books Flanimals, More Flanimals, Flanimals of the Deep, Flanimals: The Day of the Bletchling and Flanimals Pop-Up. Other work includes Erf. His latest book is The Pod. He previously played guitar in the bands Presence and Babacar.

References

Living people
Year of birth missing (living people)
English illustrators
English rock guitarists
Babacar (band) members